The New York Yankees are an American professional baseball team based in the New York City borough of the Bronx. The Yankees compete in Major League Baseball (MLB) as a member club of the American League (AL) East division. They are one of two major league clubs based in New York City, the other is the National League (NL)'s New York Mets. The team was founded in  when Frank Farrell and Bill Devery purchased the franchise rights to the defunct Baltimore Orioles (no relation to the current team of the same name) after it ceased operations and used them to establish the New York Highlanders.

The team is owned by Yankee Global Enterprises, a limited liability company that is controlled by the family of the late George Steinbrenner. Steinbrenner purchased the team from CBS in 1973. Brian Cashman is the team's general manager, and Aaron Boone is the team's field manager. The team's home games were played at the original Yankee Stadium in the Bronx from 1923 to 1973 and from 1976 to 2008. In 1974 and 1975, the Yankees shared Shea Stadium with the Mets, in addition to the New York Jets and the New York Giants. In 2009, they moved into a new ballpark of the same name that was constructed adjacent to the previous facility, which was closed and demolished. The team is perennially among the leaders in MLB attendance.

Arguably one of the most successful professional sports team in the United States, the Yankees have won 19 American League East Division titles, 40 American League pennants, and 27 World Series championships, all of which are MLB records. The team has won more titles than any other franchise in the four major North American sports leagues, after briefly trailing the NHL's Montreal Canadiens between 1993 and 1999. The Yankees have had 44 players and 11 managers inducted into the National Baseball Hall of Fame, including many of the sport's most iconic figures in history such as Babe Ruth, Lou Gehrig, Joe DiMaggio, Mickey Mantle, Yogi Berra, and Whitey Ford; more recent inductees include Mariano Rivera, and Derek Jeter, who received the two highest vote percentages of all Hall of Fame members.  According to Forbes, the Yankees are the second-highest valued sports franchise in the world, after the NFL's Dallas Cowboys, with an estimated value in 2022 of approximately $6 billion. The team has garnered enormous popularity and a dedicated fanbase, as well as widespread enmity from fans of other MLB teams. The team's rivalry with the Boston Red Sox is one of the most well-known rivalries in North American sports. The team's logo is internationally known as a fashion item, and as an icon of New York City and the United States.

From 1903 through the 2022 season, the Yankees' overall win–loss record is 10,602-8,000 (a  winning percentage).

History

1901–1902: Origins in Baltimore 

In 1900, Ban Johnson, the president of a minor league known as the Western League (1894–1899), changed the Western League name to the American League (AL) and asked the National League to classify it as a major league. Johnson held that his league would operate on friendly terms with the National League, but the National League demanded concessions which Johnson did not agree with and declared major league status for the AL in 1901 anyway.

Plans to add an AL team in New York City were blocked by the NL's New York Giants. A team was instead placed in Baltimore, Maryland, in 1901 named the Orioles. The Orioles were managed by John McGraw, who was also a part owner. After many personal clashes with Johnson, during the  season McGraw jumped to become the new manager of the Giants, taking many players with him. The Orioles limped through the remainder of the season under league control, using a roster of players loaned from the rest of the AL clubs. The Orioles were disbanded at the end of the season.

In early 1903, the two leagues decided to settle their disputes and try to coexist. At a conference, Johnson requested that an AL team be put in New York, to play alongside the NL's Giants. It was put to a vote, and 15 of the 16 major league owners agreed on it. The franchise was awarded to Frank J. Farrell and William S. Devery.

1903–1912: Move to New York and the Highlanders years

The team's new ballpark, Hilltop Park (formally known as "American League Park"), was constructed in one of Upper Manhattan's highest points—between 165th and 168th Streets in the Washington Heights neighborhood. The team was named the New York Highlanders. Fans believed the name was chosen because of the team's elevated location in Upper Manhattan, or as a nod to team president Joseph Gordon's Scottish-Irish heritage (the Gordon Highlanders were a well known Scottish military unit). The land was owned by the New York Institute for the Education of the Blind and was leased to the Highlanders for 10 years.

Initially, the team was commonly referred to as the New York Americans. The team was also referred to as the "Invaders" in the Evening Journal and The Evening World. New York Press Sports Editor Jim Price coined the unofficial nickname Yankees (or "Yanks") for the club as early as 1904, because it was easier to fit in headlines. The Highlanders finished second in the AL in 1904, 1906, and 1910. In 1904, they lost the deciding game on a wild pitch to the Boston Americans, who later became the Boston Red Sox. That year, Highlander pitcher Jack Chesbro set the single-season wins record at 41. At this time there was no formal World Series agreement wherein the AL and NL winners would play each other.

1913–1922: New owners, a new home, and a new name: Years at the Polo Grounds

The Polo Grounds, located on the shore of the Harlem River in Washington Heights, was home to the New York Giants of the National League. The Giants were inter-city rivals with the Highlanders, dating back to when Giants manager John McGraw feuded with Ban Johnson after McGraw jumped from the Orioles to the Giants. Polo Grounds III burned down in 1911 and the Highlanders shared Hilltop Park with the Giants during a two-month renovation period. Later, from 1913 to 1922, the Highlanders shared the Polo Grounds with the Giants after their lease with Hilltop Park expired.  While playing at the Polo Grounds, the name "Highlanders" fell into disuse among the press. In 1913 the team became officially known as the New York Yankees.

In the mid‑1910s, the Yankees finished towards the bottom of the standings. The relationship between Farrell and Devery became strained due to money issues and the team performance. At the start of 1915, the pair sold the team to Colonel Jacob Ruppert, a brewer, and Captain Tillinghast L'Hommedieu Huston, a contractor-engineer. Ruppert and Huston paid $350,000 with both men contributing half of the total price. After the purchase, Ruppert assumed the role of team president with Huston becoming team secretary and treasurer.

1923–1935: Sluggers and the Stadium: Ruth, Gehrig, and Murderer's Row

In the years around 1920, the Yankees, the Red Sox, and the Chicago White Sox had a détente. The trades between the three ball clubs antagonized Ban Johnson and garnered the teams the nickname "The Insurrectos". This détente paid off well for the Yankees as they increased their payroll. Most new players who later contributed to the team's success came from the Red Sox, whose owner, Harry Frazee, was trading them for large sums of money to finance his theatrical productions. Pitcher-turned-outfielder Babe Ruth was the most talented of all the acquisitions from Boston, and the outcome of that trade would haunt the Red Sox for the next 86 years, a span in which the team did not win a single World Series championship. This phenomenon eventually became known as the Curse of the Bambino, which was coined by writer Dan Shaughnessy in the 1990 book of the same name.

Ruth's multitude of home runs proved so popular that the Yankees began drawing more people than their National League counterpart, the Giants. In 1921 — the year after acquiring Ruth — the Yankees played in their first World Series. They competed against the Giants, and all eight games of the series were played in the Polo Grounds. After the 1922 season, the Yankees were told to move out of the Polo Grounds. Giants manager John McGraw became upset with the increase of Yankees attendance along with the number of home runs. He was said to have commented that the Yankees should "move to some out-of-the-way place, like Queens", but they instead broke ground for a new ballpark in the Bronx, right across the Harlem River from the Polo Grounds. In 1922, the Yankees returned to the World Series again and were dealt a second defeat at the hands of the Giants. Manager Miller Huggins and general manager Ed Barrow were important newcomers in this period. The hiring of Huggins by Ruppert in 1918 caused a rift between the owners that eventually led to Ruppert buying Huston out in 1923.

In 1923, the Yankees moved to their new home, Yankee Stadium, which took 11 months to build and cost $2.5 million. The team announced that 99,200 fans showed up on Opening Day and 25,000 were turned away.  In the first game at Yankee Stadium, Ruth hit a home run.  The stadium was nicknamed "The House That Ruth Built", due mainly to the fact that Ruth had doubled Yankees' attendance, which helped the team pay for the new stadium. At the end of the season, the Yankees faced the Giants in the World Series for the third straight year and won their first championship.

In the 1927 season, the Yankees featured a lineup that became known as "Murderers' Row", and some consider this team to be the best in the history of baseball (though similar claims have been made for other Yankee squads, notably those of 1939, 1961 and 1998). The name originated from The Tombs, a jail complex in Lower Manhattan that had specific cell block for murderers. That season, the Yankees became the first team in baseball to occupy first place every day of the season, winning 110 games. The team also swept the Pittsburgh Pirates in the World Series. Ruth's home run total of 60 in 1927 set a single-season home run record that stood until it was broken by Roger Maris in 1961, although Maris had eight additional games in which to break the record. Meanwhile, first baseman Lou Gehrig had his first big season, batting .373 with 47 home runs and 175 runs batted in (RBI), beating Ruth's single-season RBI mark which he had set in 1921. The Yankees won the World Series again in 1928.

In 1931, Joe McCarthy, who was previously manager of the Chicago Cubs, was hired as manager and brought the Yankees back to the top of the AL. They swept the Chicago Cubs in the 1932 World Series, and brought the team's streak of consecutive World Series game wins to 12. This series was made famous by Babe Ruth's "Called Shot" in game three of the series at Wrigley Field, in which Ruth pointed to center field before hitting a home run. In 1935, Ruth left the Yankees to join the NL's Boston Braves, and he made his last major league baseball appearance on May 30 of that year.

1936–1951: Joltin' Joe DiMaggio

After Ruth left the Yankees following the 1934 season, Gehrig finally had a chance to take center stage, but it was only one year before a new star appeared, Joe DiMaggio. The team won an unprecedented four straight World Series titles from 1936 to 1939. For most of 1939, however, they had to do it without Gehrig, who took himself out of the lineup on May 2 and retired due to amyotrophic lateral sclerosis, which was later known as "Lou Gehrig's Disease" in his memory. The Yankees declared July 4, 1939 to be "Lou Gehrig Day", on which they retired his number 4, the first retired number in baseball. Gehrig made a famous speech in which he declared himself to be "the luckiest man on the face of the earth." He died two years later on June 2, 1941.

The 1941 season was often described as the last year of the "Golden Era" before the United States entered World War II and other realities intervened. Numerous achievements were made in the early 1940s including Ted Williams of the Red Sox hitting for the elusive .400 batting average and Joe DiMaggio getting hits in consecutive ballgames. By the end of his hitting streak, DiMaggio hit in 56 consecutive games, the current major league record and one often deemed unbreakable.

Two months after the Yankees beat the Brooklyn Dodgers in the 1941 World Series, the first of seven October meetings between the two crosstown rivals before the Dodgers moved to Los Angeles. As a result of the mandatory draft following the Attack on Pearl Harbor, more than 90 percent of the players, including DiMaggio, were forced to suspend their playing careers and enter the military. Despite losing many of their players, the Yankees still managed to pull out a win against the St. Louis Cardinals in the 1943 World Series. Following Jacob Ruppert's death in 1939, his heirs assumed control on the team. In 1945 construction and real estate magnate Del Webb along with partners Dan Topping and Larry MacPhail purchased the team from the Ruppert estate for $2.8 million (equivalent to $ million in ); MacPhail, who was the team president, treasurer, and general manager, was bought out following the 1947 World Series.

After a few slumping seasons, McCarthy left the organization in 1946. A few interim managers later, Bucky Harris took the job, righting the ship and taking the Yankees to a hard-fought series victory against the Dodgers. Despite finishing only three games behind the Cleveland Indians in the 1948 pennant race, Harris was relieved of his duties and replaced by Casey Stengel, who had a reputation of being a clown and managing bad teams. His tenure as Yankees' field manager, however, was marked with success. The "underdog" Yankees came from behind to catch and surprise a powerful Red Sox team on the last two days of the 1949 season, a face-off that fueled the beginning of the modern Yankees–Red Sox rivalry. By this time, however, DiMaggio's career was winding down, and the "Yankee Clipper" retired after the 1951 season after numerous injuries. This year marked the arrival of Mickey Mantle, who was one of several rookies to fill the gap.

1951–1959: Stengel's Squad

Led by players like center fielder Mickey Mantle, pitcher Whitey Ford, and catcher Yogi Berra, Stengel's teams won ten pennants and seven World Series titles in his 12 seasons as the Yankees manager. The  title was the only one of those five championships not to be won against either the New York Giants or Brooklyn Dodgers; it was won in four straight games against the Whiz Kids of the Philadelphia Phillies.

In 1954, the Yankees won 103 games, but the Cleveland Indians took the pennant with a then-AL record 111 wins; 1954 was famously referred to as "The Year the Yankees Lost the Pennant". The term was coined by writer Douglass Wallop, who wrote a novel of the same name. The novel was then adapted into a musical called Damn Yankees. In , the Dodgers finally beat the Yankees in the World Series, after five previous Series losses to them. The Yankees came back strong the next year. In Game 5 of the 1956 World Series against the Dodgers, pitcher Don Larsen threw the only perfect game in World Series history, which remains the only perfect game in postseason play and the only postseason no-hitter until 2010.

The Yankees lost the 1957 World Series to the Milwaukee Braves when Lew Burdette won three games for the Braves and was awarded World Series MVP. Following the Series, the New York Giants and the Brooklyn Dodgers both left for San Francisco and Los Angeles, respectively. This left the Yankees as New York's only baseball team. In the 1958 World Series, the Yankees got their revenge against the Braves and became the second team to win the Series after being down 3–1. For the decade, the Yankees won six World Series championships (1950, 1951, 1952, 1953, 1956, 1958) and eight American League pennants (those six plus 1955 and 1957). Led by Mantle, Ford, Berra, Elston Howard (the Yankees' first African-American player), and the newly acquired Roger Maris, the Yankees entered the 1960s seeking to replicate their success of the 1950s.

1960–1964: Mantle and Maris

Arnold Johnson, owner of the Kansas City Athletics, was a longtime business associate of Yankees co-owners Del Webb and Dan Topping. Because of this "special relationship" with the Yankees, he traded young players to them in exchange for cash and aging veterans. Invariably, these trades ended up being heavily tilted in the Yankees' favor, leading to accusations that the Athletics were little more than a Yankees farm team at the major league level. Kansas City had been home to the Yankees' top farm team, the Kansas City Blues, for almost 20 years before the Athletics moved there from Philadelphia in 1954.

In 1960, Charles O. Finley purchased the Athletics and put an end to the trades with the Yankees. At that point, however, the Yankees had already strengthened their supply of future prospects, which included a young outfielder named Roger Maris. In 1960, Maris led the league in slugging percentage, RBI, and extra-base hits. He finished second in home runs (one behind Mickey Mantle) and total bases, and won a Gold Glove, which garnered enough votes for the American League MVP award.

The year 1961 was one of the most memorable in Yankees history. Mantle and Maris hit home runs at a fast pace and became known as the "M&M Boys". Ultimately, a severe hip infection forced Mantle to leave the lineup at the end of the regular season. Maris continued though, and on October 1, the last day of the regular season, he hit home run number 61, surpassing Babe Ruth's single-season home run record of 60. However, MLB Commissioner Ford Frick decreed that since Maris had played in a 162-game season, and Ruth (in 1927) had played in a 154-game season. They were considered two separate records for 30 years, until MLB reversed course and stated Maris held the record alone.  His record would be broken by Mark McGwire, who hit 70 home runs in 1998. Maris held the American League record until 2022 when Aaron Judge hit 62.

The Yankees won the pennant with a 109–53 record and went on to defeat the Cincinnati Reds in the 1961 World Series. The team finished the year with 240 home runs, which was an MLB record until surpassed by the 1996 Baltimore Orioles team with 257 home runs. In 1962, the sports scene in New York changed when the National League added an expansion team, the New York Mets. The Mets played at the Giants' former home, the Polo Grounds, for two seasons while Shea Stadium was under construction in nearby Flushing, Queens. This restored New York as a city with more than one team, as it had been from the late 1800s until 1957.  The Yankees won the 1962 World Series, their tenth in the past sixteen years, defeating the San Francisco Giants 4–3. It was the Yankees' last championship until 1977.

The Yankees easily reached the 1963 World Series when they won the pennant by 10.5 games, but they scored only four runs in the series and were swept by the Los Angeles Dodgers and their ace pitcher, Sandy Koufax. The series was the first between the Yankees and the new Los Angeles Dodgers, after their move in 1958. After the season, Yogi Berra, who had just retired from playing, took over managerial duties. The aging Yankees returned the next year for a fifth straight World Series, but were beaten 4–3 by the St. Louis Cardinals. It would be the Yankees' last World Series appearance until 1976.

1965–1972: New ownership and a steep decline
After the 1964 season, broadcasting company CBS purchased 80% of the Yankees from Topping and Webb for $11.2 million (equivalent to $ million in ). With the new ownership, the team began to decline. The 1965 edition of the team posted a record of 77–85 — the Yankees' first losing record in 40 years. In 1966, the Yankees finished in last place in the AL for the first time since 1912.  It also marked their first consecutive losing seasons since 1917 and 1918.  The 1967 season was not much better; they finished only ahead of the Kansas City Athletics in the American League. While their fortunes improved somewhat in the late 1960s and early 1970s, they finished higher than fourth only once during CBS' ownership, in 1970.

The Yankees were not able to replace their aging superstars with promising young talent, as they had consistently done in the previous five decades.  As early as the 1961–62 off-season, longtime fans noticed that the pipeline of talent from the minor league affiliates had started to dry up.  This was worsened by the introduction of the amateur draft that year, which meant that the Yankees could no longer sign any player they wanted. The Yankees was one of four teams who voted against the establishment of the draft, with the Dodgers, Mets, and Cardinals also objecting. While the Yankees usually drafted fairly early during this period due to their lackluster records, Thurman Munson was the only pick who lived up to his billing.

1973–1981: Steinbrenner, Martin, Jackson, and Munson: the Bronx Zoo
On January 3, 1973, CBS announced they were selling the club to a group of investors, led by Cleveland-based shipbuilder George Steinbrenner (1930–2010), for $10 million (equivalent to $ million in ). E. Michael Burke, who assumed the role of team president in 1966, resigned as president in April but stayed with the organization as a consultant to the owner. Within a year, Steinbrenner bought out most of his other partners and became the team's principal owner, although Burke continued to hold a minority share into the 1980s.

One of Steinbrenner's major goals was to renovate Yankee Stadium. Both the stadium and the surrounding neighborhood had deteriorated by the late 1960s. CBS initially suggested renovations, but the team needed to play elsewhere, and the Mets refused to open their home, Shea Stadium, to the Yankees. A new stadium in the Meadowlands, across the Hudson River in New Jersey, was suggested (and was eventually built, as Giants Stadium, specifically for football). Finally, in mid-1972, Mayor John Lindsay stepped in. The city bought the stadium and began an extensive two-year renovation period. Since the city also owned Shea Stadium, the Mets were forced to allow the Yankees to play two seasons there. The renovations modernized the look of the stadium, significantly altered the dimensions, and reconfigured some of the seating.

In 1973, Steinbrenner instituted a personal appearance policy that included being clean-shaven, with long hair slicked back or trimmed. In an interview with The New York Times, Steinbrenner stated the policy was to " instill a certain sense of order and discipline" in the players. The policy originated from Steinbrenner's service in the United States Air Force, which had a similar appearance policy. This rule is still in effect today, and enforced by his sons after George's passing. The Cincinnati Reds had the same personal appearance policy from 1967 until 1999.

After the 1974 season, Steinbrenner made a move that started the modern era of free agency, signing star pitcher Catfish Hunter away from Oakland. Midway through the 1975 season, the team hired former second baseman Billy Martin as manager. With Martin at the helm, the Yankees reached the 1976 World Series, but were swept by the Cincinnati Reds and their famed "Big Red Machine."

After the 1976 campaign, Steinbrenner added star Oakland outfielder Reggie Jackson—who had spent 1976 with the Baltimore Orioles—to his roster.
During spring training of 1977, Jackson alienated his teammates with controversial remarks about the Yankees captain, catcher Thurman Munson. He had bad blood with manager Billy Martin, who had managed the Detroit Tigers when Jackson's Athletics defeated them in the 1972 playoffs. Jackson, Martin, and Steinbrenner repeatedly feuded with each other throughout Jackson's 5-year contract. Martin was hired and fired by Steinbrenner five times over the next 13 years. This conflict, combined with the extremely rowdy Yankees fans of the late 1970s and the bad conditions of the Bronx, led to the Yankees organization and stadium being referred to as the "Bronx Zoo". Despite the turmoil, Jackson hit four home runs in 1977 World Series and earned the Series MVP Award and the nickname "Mr. October."

Throughout the late 1970s, the race for the pennant was often a close competition between the Yankees and the Red Sox. Despite that, during the 1978 season, the Red Sox were  games ahead of the Yankees in July. In late July, Martin suspended Reggie Jackson and fined him $9,000 (equivalent to $ in ) for "defiance" after he bunted while Martin had the "swing" signal on. Upon Jackson's return, Martin made a famous statement against both Jackson and owner Steinbrenner: "They deserve each other. One's a born liar; the other's convicted." Martin was forced to resign the next day and was replaced by Bob Lemon. This came while the team was winning five games in a row and Boston was losing five in a row.

The Yankees continued to win games, and by the time they met Boston for a pivotal four-game series at Fenway Park in early September, the Yankees were four games behind the Red Sox. The Yankees swept the Red Sox in what became known as the "Boston Massacre," winning the games 15–3, 13–2, 7–0, and 7–4. The third game was a shutout pitched by Ron Guidry, who led the majors with nine shutouts, a 25–3 record, and a 1.74 ERA.  On the last day of the season, the two clubs finished in a tie for first place in the AL East, and a tiebreaker game was held at Fenway Park. With Guidry pitching against former Yankee Mike Torrez, the Red Sox took an early 2–0 lead. In the seventh inning, light-hitting Yankee shortstop Bucky Dent drove a three-run home run over the Fenway Park's Green Monster, putting the Yankees up 3–2. Reggie Jackson's solo home run in the following inning sealed the eventual 5–4 win that gave the Yankees their one-hundredth win of the season and their third straight AL East title. Guidry earned his 25th win of the season.

After defeating the Kansas City Royals for the third consecutive year in the ALCS, the Yankees faced the Los Angeles Dodgers in the World Series. They lost the first two games in Los Angeles, but won all three games at Yankee Stadium and Game 6 back in Los Angeles, winning their 22nd world championship. Changes occurred during the 1979 season. Former Cy Young Award-winning closer Sparky Lyle was traded to the Texas Rangers for several players, including Dave Righetti. Tommy John was acquired from the Dodgers and Luis Tiant from the Red Sox to bolster the pitching staff. During the season, Bob Lemon was replaced by Billy Martin, who was serving his second stint as Yankees manager.

The 1970s ended on a tragic note for the Yankees. On August 2, 1979, catcher Thurman Munson died when his private plane crashed while he was practicing touch-and-go landings. Four days later, the entire team flew out to Canton, Ohio, for the funeral, despite having a game later that day against the Orioles. Bobby Murcer, a close friend of Munson's, along with Lou Piniella, were chosen to give the eulogy at his funeral. In a nationally televised and emotional game, Murcer used Munson's bat (which he gave to Munson's wife after the game), and drove in all five of the team's runs in a dramatic 5–4 walk-off victory. Before the game, Munson's locker sat empty except for his catching gear, a sad reminder for his teammates. His locker, labeled with his number 15, has remained empty in the Yankees clubhouse as a memorial. When the Yankees moved across the street, Munson's locker was torn out and installed in the new stadium's museum. Immediately after Munson's death, the team announced his number 15 would be retired.

The 1980 season brought more changes. Billy Martin was fired once again and Dick Howser took his place. Chris Chambliss was traded to the Toronto Blue Jays for catcher Rick Cerone. Reggie Jackson hit .300 for the only time in his career with 41 homers, and finished second in the MVP voting to Kansas City's George Brett. The Yankees won 103 games and the AL East by three games over the Baltimore Orioles, but were swept by the Royals in the ALCS.

After the season ended, the Yankees signed Dave Winfield to a 10-year contract. A contract misunderstanding led to a feud between Winfield and Steinbrenner. The team fired Howser and replaced him with Gene Michael. Under Michael, the Yankees led the AL East before a strike hit in June 1981. The Yankees struggled under Bob Lemon, who replaced Michael for the second half of the season. Thanks to the split-season playoff format, the Yankees faced the second-half winner Milwaukee Brewers in the special 1981 American League Division Series. After defeating Milwaukee 3–2, they swept the Oakland Athletics in a three-game ALCS. In the World Series, the Yankees won the first two games against the Los Angeles Dodgers. But the Dodgers fought back to win the next four games to claim the World Series title. This World Series would be the most recent between the Yankees and the Dodgers.

1982–1995: Struggles during the Mattingly years

Following the team's loss to the Dodgers in the 1981 World Series, the Yankees began their longest absence from the playoffs since 1921. Steinbrenner announced his plan to transform the Yankees from the "Bronx Bombers" into the "Bronx Burners," increasing the Yankees' ability to win games based on speed and defense instead of relying on home runs. As a first step towards this end, the Yankees signed Dave Collins from the Cincinnati Reds during the 1981 off-season. Collins was traded to the Toronto Blue Jays after the 1982 season in a deal that also included future All-Stars Fred McGriff and Mike Morgan. In return the Yankees got Dale Murray and Tom Dodd.

The Yankees of the 1980s were led by All-Star first baseman Don Mattingly. In spite of accumulating the most total wins of any major league team, they failed to win a World Series (the 1980s were the first decade since the 1910s in which the Yankees did not win at least two Series) and had only two playoff appearances. They consistently had a powerful offense, with Mattingly and Winfield competing for the best average in the AL for the 1984 season. Despite their offense, the Yankees teams of the 1980s lacked sufficient starting pitching to win a championship in the 1980s. After posting a 22–6 record in 1985, arm problems caught up with Guidry, and his performance declined over the next three years. He retired after the 1988 season. Of the remaining mainstays of the Yankees' rotation, only Dave Righetti stood out, pitching a no-hitter on July 4, 1983, but he was moved to the bullpen the next year where he helped to define the closer role.

Despite the Yankees' lack of pitching success during the 1980s, they had three of the premier pitchers of the early 1990s on their roster during these years in Al Leiter, Doug Drabek and José Rijo. All were mismanaged and dealt away before they could reach their full potential, with only Rijo returning much value – he was traded to the Oakland A's in the deal that brought Henderson to New York. The team came close to winning the AL East in 1985 and 1986, finishing second to the Toronto Blue Jays and Boston Red Sox, respectively, but fell to fourth place in 1987 and fifth in 1988, despite having mid-season leads in the AL East both years.

By the end of the decade, the Yankees' offense declined. Henderson and third baseman Mike Pagliarulo had departed by the middle of 1989, while back problems hampered both Winfield (who missed the entire 1989 season) and Mattingly (who missed almost the entire second half of 1990). Winfield's tenure with the team ended when he was dealt to the California Angels. From 1989 to 1992, the team had a losing record, spending significant money on free-agents and draft picks who did not live up to expectations. In 1990, the Yankees had the worst record in the American League, and their fourth last-place finish in franchise history.

During the 1990 season, Yankee fans started to chant "1918!" to taunt the Red Sox, reminding them of the last time they won a World Series one weekend the Red Sox were there in 1990. Each time the Red Sox were at Yankee Stadium afterward, chants of "1918!" echoed through the stadium. Yankee fans also taunted the Red Sox with signs saying "CURSE OF THE BAMBINO", pictures of Babe Ruth, and wearing "1918!" T-shirts each time they were at the stadium. These fans came to be known as the Bleacher Creatures.

The poor showings in the 1980s and early 1990s soon changed. Steinbrenner hired Howard Spira to uncover damaging information on Winfield and was subsequently suspended from day-to-day team operations by Commissioner Fay Vincent for two years when the plot was revealed. This turn of events allowed management to implement a coherent acquisition and development program without owner interference. General Manager Gene Michael, along with manager Buck Showalter, shifted the club's emphasis from high-priced acquisitions to developing talent through the farm system. This new philosophy developed key players such as outfielder Bernie Williams, shortstop Derek Jeter, catcher Jorge Posada, and pitchers Andy Pettitte and Mariano Rivera. The first significant success came in 1994, when the Yankees had the best record in the AL, but the season was cut short by a players' strike. Because the Yankees were last in a postseason in a season cut short by a strike, the news media constantly reminded the Yankees about the parallels between these two Yankees teams, which included both teams having division leads taken away by strike. Throughout October, the media continued to speculate about what might have been if there had not been a strike, making references to the day's games in the postseason would have been played.

A year later, the team qualified for the playoffs in the new wild card slot in the strike-shortened 1995 season. In the memorable 1995 American League Division Series against the Seattle Mariners, the Yankees won the first two games at home and lost the next three in Seattle. Although Mattingly batted .417 with a home run and six RBI in the only postseason series of his career, his back problems led him to retire after the 1997 season after sitting out the 1996 season.

1996–2007: Core Four: Jeter, Posada, Pettitte, and Rivera

Joe Torre had a mediocre run as a manager in the National League, and the choice was initially derided ("Clueless Joe" was a headline in the New York Daily News). However, his calm demeanor proved to be a good fit, and his tenure was the longest under George Steinbrenner's ownership. Torre was announced as the new Yankees manager in November 1995.

The 1996 season saw the rise of three Yankees who formed the core of the team for years to come: rookie shortstop Derek Jeter, second-year starting pitcher Andy Pettitte, and second-year pitcher Mariano Rivera, who served as setup man in 1996 before becoming closer in 1997. Aided by these young players, the Yankees won their first AL East title in 15 years. They defeated the Texas Rangers in the ALDS, and in ALCS beat the Baltimore Orioles 4–1, which included a notable fan interference by Jeffrey Maier that was called as a home run for the Yankees. In the World Series the team rebounded from an 0–2 series deficit and defeated the defending champion Atlanta Braves, ending an 18-year championship drought. Jeter was named Rookie of the Year. In 1997, the Yankees lost the 1997 ALDS to the Cleveland Indians 3–2. General manager Bob Watson stepped down and was replaced by assistant general manager Brian Cashman.

The 1998 Yankees are widely acknowledged to be one of the greatest teams in baseball history, compiling a record of 114–48, a then–AL record for the most wins in a season. On May 17, 1998, David Wells pitched a perfect game against the Minnesota Twins.
The Yankees went on to sweep the San Diego Padres in the World Series. Their 125 combined regular and postseason wins remains an MLB single-season record. On July 18, 1999, David Cone pitched a perfect game against the Montreal Expos. The ALCS was the Yankees' first postseason meeting with the rival Red Sox. The 1999 Yankees defeated the Red Sox 4–1 and swept the Braves in the 1999 World Series giving the 1998–99 Yankees a combined 22–3 record in the (including four series sweeps) in the six post-season series those years.

In 2000, the Yankees faced the Mets in the first New York City Subway World Series in 44 years. The Yankees won the series in 5 games, but a loss in Game 3 snapped their streak of consecutive games won in World Series contests at 14, surpassing the club's previous record of 12 (in 1927, 1928, and 1932). The Yankees are the last MLB team to repeat as World Series champions and after the 2000 season they joined the Yankees teams of 1936–39 and 1949–53, as well as the 1972–74 Oakland Athletics as the only teams to win at least three consecutive World Series.

In aftermath of the September 11, 2001 terrorist attacks, the Yankees defeated the Oakland Athletics in the ALDS, and the Seattle Mariners in the ALCS. By winning the pennant for a fourth straight year, the 1998–2001 Yankees joined the 1921–24 New York Giants, and the Yankees teams of 1936–39, 1949–53, 1955–58 and 1960–64 as the only teams to win at least four straight pennants. The Yankees won 11 consecutive postseason series in this 4-year period. In the World Series against the Arizona Diamondbacks, the Yankees lost the series when Rivera uncharacteristically blew a save in the bottom of the ninth inning of Game 7. Also, despite a very poor series overall, batting under .200, Derek Jeter got the nickname, "Mr. November", echoing comparisons to Reggie Jackson's "Mr. October", for his walk-off home run in Game 4, though it began October 31, as the game ended in the first minutes of November 1. In addition, Yankee Stadium played host for a memorial service titled "Prayer for America" for the September 11 victims.

A vastly revamped Yankees team finished the 2002 season with an AL-best record of 103–58. The season was highlighted by Alfonso Soriano becoming the first second baseman ever to hit 30 home runs and steal 30 bases in a season. In the ALDS the Yankees lost to the eventual World Series champion Anaheim Angels 3–1. In 2003, the Yankees again had the best league record (101–61), highlighted by Roger Clemens' 300th win and 4000th strikeout. In the ALCS, they defeated the Boston Red Sox in a dramatic seven-game series, which featured a bench-clearing incident in Game 3 and a series-ending walk-off home run by Aaron Boone in the bottom of the 11th inning of Game 7. In the World Series the Yankees lost in 6 games to the Florida Marlins.

In 2004, the Yankees signed free agents Kenny Lofton and Gary Sheffield; and traded Alfonso Soriano to the Texas Rangers in exchange for star shortstop Alex Rodriguez, who moved to third base from his usual shortstop position to accommodate Jeter. In the ALCS, the Yankees met the Boston Red Sox again, and became the first team in professional baseball history, and only the third team in North American professional sports history, to lose a best-of-seven series after taking a 3–0 series lead. In 2005 Alex Rodriguez won the American League MVP award, becoming the first Yankee to win the award since Don Mattingly in 1985. The Yankees again won the AL East by virtue of a tiebreaker but lost the ALDS 3–2 to the Angels. The 2006 season was highlighted by a 5-game series sweep of the Red Sox at Fenway Park (sometimes referred to as the "Second Boston Massacre"), outscoring the Red Sox 49–26. The Red Sox would go on to defeat the Cardinals in the World Series, their first championship since 1918.

Despite winning the AL East for the ninth consecutive year, the Yankees lost again in the 2006 ALDS, this time to the Detroit Tigers. After the ALDS was over, tragedy struck when pitcher Cory Lidle died when his plane crashed into a highrise apartment building in Manhattan. Along with Thurman Munson, Lidle was the second active Yankee to be killed in a private plane crash.

On June 18, 2007, the Yankees broke new ground by signing the first two professional baseball players from the People's Republic of China to the MLB, and became the first team in MLB history to sign an advertising deal with a Chinese company. The Yankees' streak of nine straight AL East division titles ended in 2007, but they still reached the playoffs with the AL Wild Card. For the third year in a row, the team lost in the first round of the playoffs, as the Cleveland Indians defeated the Yankees, 3–1, in the 2007 ALDS. After the series, Joe Torre declined a reduced-length and compensation contract offer from the Yankees and returned to the National League as manager of the Los Angeles Dodgers.

2008–2016: Championship run, followed by losing streak

After Torre's departure, the Yankees signed former catcher Joe Girardi to a three-year contract to manage the club. The 2008 season was the last season played at Yankee Stadium. To celebrate the final year and history of Yankee Stadium, the 2008 Major League Baseball All-Star Game was played there. The final regular-season game at Yankee Stadium was played on September 21, 2008 with the Yankees defeating the Orioles. After the game, Jeter addressed the crowd, thanking them for their support over the years, and urging them to "take the memories of this field, add them to the new memories that will come at the new Yankee Stadium and continue to pass them on from generation to generation." Despite multiple midseason roster moves, the team was hampered by injuries and missed the playoffs for the first time in 14 seasons.

During the off-season, the Yankees retooled their roster with several star free agent acquisitions, including CC Sabathia, Mark Teixeira, and A. J. Burnett. At the beginning of the 2009 season, the Yankees opened the new Yankee Stadium, located just a block north on River Avenue from their former home. The Yankees set a major league record by playing error-free ball for 18 consecutive games from May 14 to June 1, 2009. Midway during the season at the trade deadline, the Yankees added OF/3B Eric Hinske from the Pirates, 3B Jerry Hairston Jr. from the Reds, and P Chad Gaudin from the Padres. The Yankees finished first in the AL East. In the ALDS they swept the Minnesota Twins before defeating the Los Angeles Angels in the ALCS, 4–2. They Yankees defeated the Philadelphia Phillies, in the World Series  4–2, their 27th World Series title.

The 2010 season featured the rivalry between the Yankees and Red Sox being revived to start and end the season. The Yankees and the Red Sox started and finished the season against each other at Fenway Park. This was the first time since 1950 this had happened. In June, Joe Torre's Dodgers played games against the Yankees for the first time since he became manager of the Dodgers, with the Yankees taking two out of three games in the series. During the 2010 All-Star break, public address announcer Bob Sheppard and principal owner George Steinbrenner died. Eight days later, another longtime Yankee icon, former player and manager Ralph Houk, died. The Yankees won the American League Wild Card. They swept the Minnesota Twins in the 2010 American League Division Series, but lost to the Texas Rangers in the ALCS, 4–2.

In a 22–9 win over the Oakland Athletics on August 25, 2011, the Yankees became the first team in Major League history to hit three grand slams in a single game. They were hit by Robinson Canó, Russell Martin, and Curtis Granderson. The Yankees won the AL East title, finishing with 97 wins and took home field throughout the AL postseason. However, they were defeated by the Tigers, 3–2, in the ALDS.

In 2012, the Yankees again finished the season with the AL's best record at 95–67. In mid-July, the Yankees traded two prospects to the Seattle Mariners for Ichiro Suzuki. They faced the Orioles in the ALDS. In Game 3, Raúl Ibañez became the oldest player to hit two home runs in a game, the oldest to hit a walk-off home run, the first substitute position player in a postseason game to hit two home runs, and the first to hit two home runs in the 9th inning or later in a postseason game, in the Yankees' 3–2 win. The Yankees defeated the Orioles in five games. However, in the ALCS, the Yankees lost to the Tigers again, this time in a four-game sweep, which was compounded with a struggling offense and a season-ending injury to Derek Jeter.

The 2013 season was riddled with injuries. Mark Teixeira strained his elbow during the World Baseball Classic prior to the start of the season and played only 15 games for the Yankees. Alex Rodriguez played only 44 games after a hip surgery, Jeter played only 17 games due to his ankle injury from the 2012 ALCS, and Curtis Granderson played only 61 games due to forearm and knuckle injuries. On April 12, 2013, the Yankees made their second triple play ever. It was scored as 4–6–5–6–5–3–4, the first triple play of its kind in baseball history. On September 25, the Yankees lost to the Tampa Bay Rays, which for the second time in the wild-card era, eliminated them from playoff contention. They ended the season 85–77, finishing in 3rd place in the AL East.

During the 2013–14 off-season, the Yankees signed Brian McCann, Jacoby Ellsbury, Masahiro Tanaka, and Carlos Beltrán. Despite that, the Yankees missed the playoffs, finishing 2nd in the AL East with an 84–78 record. Rodriguez missed the entire season due to a 162-game suspension for his participation in the Biogenesis baseball scandal. One notable moment happened on September 25, 2014, when Jeter – playing his final home game – hit a walk-off single off pitcher Evan Meek to defeat the Baltimore Orioles in front of a sold out stadium. Reliever Dellin Betances finished 3rd in voting for AL Rookie of the Year, while starting pitcher Masahiro Tanaka finished 5th.

The Yankees would return to the playoffs in 2015.  In his return from suspension, Rodriguez hit 33 home runs, his most since 2008, and tied Hank Aaron's record of fifteen 30-home-run seasons. Teixeira hit 31 home runs before a hit-by-pitch ended his season in August. Rookie first baseman Greg Bird had an impressive showing in Teixeira's place, hitting 11 home runs in 46 games, while rookie starting pitcher Luis Severino went 5–3 with a 2.89 ERA in  innings after getting called up in August. Closer Andrew Miller won the AL Reliever of the Year Award. The Yankees led the AL East for most of the year before being felled by a surging Toronto Blue Jays team, ending the season 87–75 and in 2nd place. They were defeated by the Houston Astros in the 2015 American League Wild Card Game.

In the off-season, the Yankees traded for Cincinnati Reds' closer Aroldis Chapman after a domestic violence allegation lowered his value. Chapman was later suspended 30 games. The Yankees struggled through the 2016 season, ending at 4th place in the AL East. The resurgent 2015 experienced by Rodriguez and Teixeira did not carry over, as they batted .200 and .204 for the season, respectively. Bird was ruled out for the season after undergoing shoulder surgery. Starting pitcher Michael Pineda struggled, going 6–12 with a 4.82 ERA, the 7th-highest in baseball. At the trade deadline, the Yankees stood at an uninspiring 52–52, and traded Chapman and Miller to the Cubs and Indians, respectively.

2017–present: Baby Bombers

The Aroldis Chapman and Andrew Miller trade brought a group of players that included top shortstop prospect Gleyber Torres, outfielder Clint Frazier and pitcher Justus Sheffield. In addition, the Yankees traded 39-year-old designated hitter Carlos Beltran to the Texas Rangers for minor league prospects. The Yankees' decision to be sellers, rather than buyers, at the trade deadline was unusual, given the Yankees' typical win-now approach. In discussing the midseason trades, Yankees general manager Brian Cashman said that the Yankees recognized the "need to look toward the future."

In early August, both Teixeira and Rodriguez revealed their plans to retire by the season's end. Rodriguez played his final game on August 12, 2016, accepting a front office job with the Yankees shortly after. In one of his final games, Teixeira hit a walk-off grand slam against the Boston Red Sox, his 409th and last career home run. The Yankees called up Tyler Austin and outfielder Aaron Judge in August. They made their debuts on August 13, hitting back-to-back home runs in their first career at-bats. Catcher Gary Sánchez hit 20 home runs in 53 games, finishing 2nd in AL Rookie of the Year voting and setting the record at the time as the fastest to reach 20 career home runs. Sanchez, Judge and Austin, as well as the Yankees' prosperous farm system in general, became nicknamed the "Baby Bombers".

After having traded Chapman to the Cubs during the 2016 season, the Yankees signed him as a free agent during the 2016–17 off-season; Chapman agreed to a five-year, $86 million contract, the most lucrative in history for a relief pitcher. In 2017, the Yankees finished the season with a record of 91–71.  They finished second in the AL East behind the Boston Red Sox, but captured the first AL Wild Card spot. Judge and Sánchez combined for 85 home runs. Sanchez finished with 33, the most by a Yankees catcher in a single season. Judge led the American League with 52 home runs, breaking Mark McGwire's major league record for most home runs by a rookie in a single season (McGwire hit 49 in 1987). The Yankees starting pitching was led by ace Luis Severino, who rebounded from his last season to lead the Yankees' pitching staff. On July 1, Clint Frazier made his MLB debut where he went 2 for 4 with a home run. The Yankees sent Dellin Betances, Starlin Castro, Sánchez, Severino, and Judge to the 2017 All-Star Game. Judge won the 2017 Home Run Derby, making the Yankees the team with the most players in history to win a Home Run Derby.

After the 2017 All-Star break, the Yankees made a series of moves to acquire third baseman Todd Frazier, former Yankees reliever David Robertson, reliever Tommy Kahnle, starter Sonny Gray, and starter Jaime Garcia. In the 2017 AL Wild Card Game the Yankees defeated the Minnesota Twins to move on the ALDS. In the ALDS, the Yankees lost the first two games to the Cleveland Indians before winning the final three games and taking the series. They played the Houston Astros in the 2017 American League Championship Series and lost the series in seven games.

In the 2017–18 off-season, the Yankees hired Aaron Boone to succeed Girardi as their new manager. The Yankees traded Starlin Castro and prospects Jorge Guzman and Jose Devers to the Miami Marlins for reigning National League Most Valuable Player Giancarlo Stanton. A right fielder who bats right-handed, Stanton hit 59 home runs and drove in 132 runs—both major league highs—in 2017; his contract was the largest player contract in the history of professional sports in North America at the time. The Yankees also traded third baseman Chase Headley and pitcher Bryan Mitchell to the San Diego Padres for outfielder Jabari Blash; following the move, Yankees GM Brian Cashman stated that the trade "create[d] payroll flexibility". On September 29, 2018 Gleyber Torres hit the Yankees 265th home run of the season which broke the record of the most home runs in a season, previously held by the 1997 Seattle Mariners. The Yankees ended the 2018 season with 267 home runs as well as a record of 100–62. In the 2018 playoffs, the Yankees defeated the Oakland Athletics in the Wild Card game, advancing to face the 108-win Red Sox in the ALDS. The Yankees fell to the Red Sox in the ALDS 3–1. In Game 3, the Yankees suffered their worst playoff defeat in team history, by a score of 16–1.

On June 25, 2019, the Yankees broke the record for the most home runs in consecutive games against the Toronto Blue Jays. On September 27, the Yankees became the second team to reach 300 homers in a season, achieved by their ALDS opponent, the Minnesota Twins, a day earlier. The Yankees traveled to London in late June to play the Red Sox in the first ever MLB London Series, in addition to the first MLB games played in Europe. The Yankees swept Boston in the two-game series, with the first game lasted 4 hours and 42 minutes, 3 minutes shorter than the longest MLB 9-inning game. The Yankees ended the 2019 season with a record of 103–59, winning the AL East division title for the first time since 2012. The Yankees beat the Twins in a three-game sweep to advance to the ALCS for the second time in three seasons. However, on October 19, the Houston Astros beat the Yankees in the ALCS 4–2. With this loss, the 2010s decade became the first since the 1980s to have the Yankees fail to win a World Series and the first since the 1910s to have the Yankees failing to play in one.

During the 2019 offseason, on December 18, 2019, the Yankees signed Gerrit Cole to a nine-year, $324 million contract. The contract is one of the biggest free agent contracts in MLB history, behind Bryce Harper of the Phillies and Corey Seager of the Texas Rangers.  On August 28, 2020, the Yankees gave up a walk-off home run to Amed Rosario of the Mets in Yankee Stadium. The Mets were the home team because they were making up for a previously cancelled game. It was the first time a visiting player had hit a walk-off home run since Ed McKean hit one for the St. Louis Perfectos against the Cleveland Spiders in 1899. The Yankees finished the shortened 2020 season with a record of 33–27, finishing second in AL East. In the first round of the playoffs they swept the Cleveland Indians beating them in 2 games in the wild card series. In the ALDS, however, the Yankees were defeated by the Tampa Bay Rays in five games, marking four consecutive playoff exits.

Throughout the 2021 season, the Yankees finished with a 92-70 record, finishing in third place in the division. They made it in the second wild card spot, where they would play the Boston Red Sox in the Wild Card game at Fenway Park. The Yankees lost by a score of 6-2 after a poor performance by starter and ace Gerrit Cole. Some highlights from the 2021 season include the transactions of former all star players Rougned Odor, Corey Kluber, Anthony Rizzo, and Joey Gallo. On May 19, 2021, former Cy Young Award winner Corey Kluber threw a no-hitter against the Texas Rangers. This was the Yankees 12th no-hitter of all time, and the first since David Cone's perfect game in 1999. The Yankees also recorded a record-tying three triple plays throughout the 2021 season.

During the 2021 offseason, owners of MLB teams initiated a work stoppage after the 2016 collective bargaining agreement between the league and players expired. On March 10, 2022, the lockout ended when the league and Major League Baseball Players Association agreeing on a CBA. Before the start of the 2022, the Yankees would trade away Gio Urshela, and Gary Sánchez for former AL MVP, Josh Donaldson. Yankees general manager Brian Cashman, and the Yankees organization were criticized by the fans for not signing many of the big name free agents that were available to sign, including Carlos Correa and Freddie Freeman.

The Yankees started hot at the start of the 2022 season, as they were 64–28 in the first half of the season leading to the All-Star Game. However, in the second half they would then go 35–35, failing to win 100 games after being on track for it in June. Despite their struggles in the second half of the season, the Yankees clinched their 30th straight winning season. On October 4, Aaron Judge hit his 62nd home run, breaking the American League single-season home run record set in 1961 by Roger Maris. The Yankees would go on to win the AL East division title and defeat the Cleveland Guardians in the ALDS in five games. However, the Yankees would once again lose to the Houston Astros in the ALCS, being swept in four games. In the offseason, Jose Trevino would become the first Yankee ever to win the Platinum Glove Award. Aaron Judge would also win AL MVP after having an historic season, being the first Yankee to win the award since Alex Rodriguez did in 2007.

On December 21, 2022 Aaron Judge was named the 16th captain in Yankees history, after getting resigned to a nine-year, $360 million contract. Judge was named the first captain of the team since Derek Jeter retired in 2014.

Distinctions

The Yankees have won 27 World Series in 40 appearances, the most in Major League Baseball in addition to major North American professional sports leagues. The St. Louis Cardinals are in second place with 11 World Series championships with their last win in 2011. The Dodgers are second in total World Series appearances with 20.  The Yankees have lost 13 World Series, the second most in the MLB behind the Dodgers, who have 14 losses. The Yankees have faced the Dodgers 11 times, going 8–3. Among North American major sports, the Yankees' success is approached by only the 24 Stanley Cup championships of the Montreal Canadiens of the National Hockey League. The Yankees have played in the World Series against every National League pennant winner except the Houston Astros and the Colorado Rockies.

Through 2021, the Yankees have an all-time regular season winning percentage of .570 (a 10,548 – 7,953 record), the best of any team in MLB history. On June 25, 2019, they set a new major league record for homering in 28 consecutive games, breaking the record set by the 2002 Texas Rangers. The streak would reach 31 games, during which they hit 57 home runs. With the walk-off solo home run by DJ LeMahieu to win the game against the Oakland Athletics on August 31, 2019, the Yankees ended the month of August that year now holding a new record of 74 home runs hit in the month alone, a new record for the most home runs hit in a month by a single MLB team.

World Series championships
The Yankees have won a record 27 World Series championships. Their most recent one came when the new stadium opened in 2009; they defeated the Philadelphia Phillies in six games under manager Joe Girardi.

Team nicknames
The team has acquired different nicknames over the years by both baseball personalities and the media. Sportswriter Fred Lieb, in a 1922 story for the Baseball Magazine, said he will call the club "the Yanks" in his articles. He stated the nickname "will fit into heads better". Their most prominently used nickname is "the Bronx Bombers" or simply "the Bombers", a reference to their home and their prolific hitting. The nickname "Bronx Bombers" was first used in an article in the New York World-Telegram in 1936. Writer Paul Dickson said the nickname originated from boxer Joe Louis, whose nickname is the "Brown Bomber".

A less used nickname is "the Pinstripes" or "Pinstripers", in reference to the iconic feature on their home uniforms. The term "Murderers' Row" has historically been used to refer to both the 1920s Yankees and the team altogether. Critics often refer to the team and the organization as "the Evil Empire", a term applied to the Yankees by Boston Red Sox president Larry Lucchino in a 2002 interview with The New York Times after the Yankees signed pitching prospect José Contreras.  Ironically, Yankee fans and supporters refer to their team as the "Evil Empire" as a badge of honor and in fact enjoy having their team play the villain. The team also embraced the label as well, with the stadium playing "The Imperial March" from Star Wars, the song associated with antagonist Darth Vader, at home games. A term from the team's tumultuous late 1970s, "the Bronx Zoo", is sometimes used by detractors, as well as the "Damn Yankees", after the musical of the same name.

Logos and uniforms

The Yankees logo and uniform design has changed throughout the team's history. During the inaugural Highlanders season in 1903, the uniform featured a large "N" and a "Y" on each breast. In 1909, the "N" and "Y" were combined and was added to both the left breast and caps. According to history, the interlocking "NY" letters predates the New York Yankees. The letters appear on the New York City Police Department Medal for Valor, which was established in 1977 and was designed by Tiffany & Co. Three years later, black pinstripes were added to the Highlander uniforms for the first time. The current cap look, a navy blue hat with the white interlocking "NY" letters, was adopted in 1932. Both the home and away uniforms has been relatively unchanged since the 1920s and 1940s, respectively. The away uniform is grey in color with "NEW YORK" across the chest.

Popularity

Fan support

With their recurring success since the 1920s, the Yankees have since been one of the most popular teams in the world, with their fan base coming from much further than the New York metropolitan area. The Yankees typically bring an upsurge in attendance at all or most of their various road-trip venues, drawing crowds of their own fans, as well as home-town fans whose interest is heightened when the Yankees come to town.

The Yankees have consistently been the most attended MLB games. The first 1 million-fan season was in 1920, when more than 1.2 millions fans attended Yankee games at the Polo Grounds. According to Baseball-Reference.com, the 2008 season saw the most fans per game in Yankees history, with an average of 53,000 per game. In the past seven years, the Yankees have drawn over three million fans each year, with an American League record-setting 4,090,696 in 2005, becoming only the third franchise in sports history to draw over four million in regular-season attendance in their own ballpark. The Yankees were the league leaders in "road attendance" each year from 2001 through 2006.

Some Yankees superfans have become notable in their own right. One famous fan was Freddy Schuman, popularly known as "Freddy Sez." For over 50 years, he came to the Yankees' home games with a baseball cap, a Yankees' jersey (which on the back bears his own name), and a cake pan with a shamrock painted on it, which was connected to a sign inscribed with words of encouragement for the home team. Schuman died on October 17, 2010, at the age of 85. The popularity of the Yankees also extended internationally. According to a Major League Baseball executive, the Yankees logo is considered a "sign of quality" despite many people not knowing the team.

The Bleacher Creatures

The "Bleacher Creatures" are a group of fans known for their strict allegiance to the Yankees and are often merciless to opposing fans who sit in the section and cheer for the road team. They occupied Section 39 in the right-field bleachers at the old Yankee Stadium and occupy Section 203 in the new stadium. The Bleacher Creatures are known for their use of chants and songs, with the "roll call" at the beginning of each home game being the most prominent.

The "creatures" got their nickname from New York Daily News columnist Filip "Flip" Bondy, who spent the 2004 season sitting in the section for research on his book about the group, Bleeding Pinstripes: A Season with the Bleacher Creatures of Yankee Stadium, published in 2005. Throughout the years both at the old and new stadiums, the Bleacher Creatures have attracted controversy for the use of derogatory and homophobic chants and rowdiness aimed at both opposing fans and players.

The Judge's Chambers at Yankee Stadium 
In 2017, team management ordered the creation of a special cheer section within Section 104 for fans of Yankees outfielder Aaron Judge, called "the Judge's Chambers". They were the second AL team to create a special cheering section, following the Seattle Mariners and the "King's Court" for pitcher Félix Hernández. The Judge's Chambers was added in response to his rise as one of the league's most popular young stars. The section's 18 seats are given to lucky ticketholders and their families, along with black judicial robes with the team logo on the front and Judge's 99 jersey number on the back; prior to the addition of the section, fans were wearing white wigs and judicial robes to games in support of Judge. Occasionally, community organizations, charities and Little League teams are given precedence when selecting participants. The seats, which are close to his position in right field, are surrounded by mahogany wood to emulate the appearance of the city's courthouses.

Team ownership

The Yankees baseball club is formally owned by Yankee Global Enterprises, a holding company in turn majorly owned by the Steinbrenner family. Yankee Global Enterprises also has a minority stake in the YES Network, the Yankees main television network. Since purchasing the team from CBS in 1973, George Steinbrenner was involved in daily team operations, including player and manager signings.  Steinbrenner retired from day-to-day team operations in 2005, handing over control to Steve Swindal, his then son-in-law. Swindal was bought out in 2007 with George's son Hal Steinbrenner becoming chairman of Yankee Global Enterprises and the team's managing partner. George Steinbrenner, citing declining health, formally handed control of the team to both Hal and brother Hank in October 2007. George Steinbrenner died in 2010 and Hank died ten years later, leaving Hal as the main managing partner. In 2008, the Yankees announced a joint venture with the National Football League's Dallas Cowboys to form the basis for a partnership in running food and beverage, and other catering services to both teams' stadiums.

The Yankees has consistently been one of the most valuable sport teams in the world. In 2013, Forbes magazine ranked New York Yankees as the fourth most valuable sports team in the world, behind association football clubs Real Madrid of La Liga, Manchester United of the Premier League and Barcelona of La Liga, a value of $2.3 billion. In 2017, Forbes magazine ranked the Yankees as the second most valuable sports team at $3.7 billion behind the Dallas Cowboys, up 9% from 2016. In 2019, Forbes magazine again ranked the Yankees as the most valuable MLB team at $4.6 billion, up 15% from 2018, behind only the Dallas Cowboys. In 2022, the Yankees were again ranked as the second most valuable team behind the Cowboys, valued at $6 billion.

Criticism
With the long-term success of the franchise and a large Yankee fanbase, many fans of other teams have come to dislike the Yankees. When the Yankees are on the road, it is common for the home fans to chant "Yankees Suck". According to the opinion poll and analytics website FiveThirtyEight, the Yankees were the MLB's least liked team, with 48% of fans expressing an "unfavorable" view of the team.

Much of the animosity toward the team may derive from its high payroll and "buying" champions instead of developing players. Their payroll was around $200 million at the start of the 2008 season, the highest of any American sports team. In 2005, the team's average player salary was $2.6 million with the Yankees having the five highest paid players in MLB. During his tenure as team owner, George Steinbrenner attracted controversy for his public criticism of players and managers and for high personnel turnover. Manager Billy Martin was hired and fired a total of five times under Steinbrenner. Chicago Tribune columnist Mike Royko noted, "Hating the Yankees is as American as pizza pie, unwed mothers, and cheating on your income tax."

Fight and theme songs

The official fight song for the Yankees is "Here Come the Yankees", written in 1967 by Bob Bundin and Lou Stallman. The song was used extensively in radio and television broadcast introductions. The song, however, did not catch on with fans and has been rarely used past the 1990s. This is contrasted to other, more popular fight songs such as "Meet the Mets", which is played at every Mets home game. Another song strongly linked to the team is "New York, New York", which is played in the stadium after home games. George Steinbrenner started playing the song during the 1980 season. The Frank Sinatra cover version is traditionally played after victories, and the Liza Minnelli original version after losses. However, due to a complaint from Minnelli, the Frank Sinatra version is played after home games, regardless of the result.

A wide selection of songs are played regularly at the stadium, many of them live on the Stadium's Hammond organ. One of the popular songs is "God Bless America", which has been played during the seventh-inning stretch since September 11. The version typically played for many years since 2001 was an abbreviated version of Kate Smith's rendition. In 2019 the Yankees stopped playing Smith's rendition to allegations of racism in some of her songs. The team switched to a live version by the stadium organist during the stretch in the interim. In 2021, the organ version was replaced by a recording of the Robert Merrill cover of the song. Merrill was the national anthem singer in the old Yankees Stadium for Opening Day and other special events before passing away in 1998. During the 5th inning, the grounds crew, while performing their duties, dance to "Y.M.C.A.". Former Yankees executive Joseph Molloy said that he saw fans dancing to the song during a spring training game in the mid 1990s. Molloy told Steinbrenner, who started to play the song at the stadium.

Radio and television

The Yankees Entertainment and Sports (YES) Network was launched in 2002 and serves as the primary home of the New York Yankees. As of 2022, Michael Kay is the play-by-play announcer with David Cone, John Flaherty, and Paul O'Neill working as commentators as part of a three-man, or occasionally two-man, booth. Bob Lorenz hosts both the pre-game and the post-game shows with Jack Curry, and Meredith Marakovits and Nancy Newman are the on-site reporters. Select games are available streaming only on Amazon Prime in the New York metropolitan area, these games formally aired on WPIX and WWOR-TV. Radio broadcasts are on the Yankees Radio Network, the flagship station being WFAN 660 AM, with John Sterling as the play-by-play announcer and Suzyn Waldman providing the commentary. Spanish-language broadcasts are on WADO 1280 AM, with Rickie Ricardo calling the games.

Past announcers
Mel Allen was the team's lead announcer from 1948 to 1964. He was known as "The voice of the Yankees."
Russ Hodges had a brief stint with Mel Allen before he took over as the lead announcer with the New York Giants.
Red Barber called Yankees games for 13 seasons, from 1954 to 1966.
Jerry Coleman called Yankees games from 1963 to 1970. Coleman was the Yankees second baseman from 1949 to 1957.
Joe Garagiola called Yankees games from 1965 to 1967.
Frank Messer, Phil Rizzuto and Bill White teamed together in the 1970s and 1980s. Rizzuto, with 40 years in the broadcast booth, was the longest-serving broadcaster in the history of the club. Messer and White each worked nearly two decades for the Yankees, with White notably moving on to become president of the National League in 1989.
Bobby Murcer also called games for over twenty years, and continued with the YES Network until shortly before his death from brain cancer in 2008.

Roster

Retired numbers

The Yankees have retired 22 numbers for 24 individuals, the most in Major League Baseball.

The retired numbers were displayed behind the old Yankee Stadium's left-field fence and in front of the opposing team's bullpen, forming a little alley that connects Monument Park to the left-field stands. When the franchise moved across the street to the new stadium, the numbers were incorporated into Monument Park that sits place in center field between both bullpens. The 21 numbers are placed on the wall in chronological order, beginning with Lou Gehrig's number 4. This was retired soon after Gehrig left baseball on July 4, 1939, the same day he gave his famous farewell speech. His was the first number retired in Major League Baseball history. Beneath the numbers are plaques with the names of the players and a descriptive paragraph.

The number 42 was retired throughout Major League Baseball in honor of Jackie Robinson on April 15, 1997, the 50th anniversary of his breaking the color barrier. The day was declared Jackie Robinson Day, and was later observed by all of baseball, with select players from every team wearing the number 42. Players who wore No. 42 at the time were allowed to continue to wear it until they left the team with which they played on April 15, 1997; Mariano Rivera was the last active player covered under that grandfather clause.

In 1972, the number 8 was retired for two players on the same day, in honor of catcher Bill Dickey and his protege, catcher Yogi Berra. Berra inherited Dickey's number in 1948 after Dickey ended his playing career and became a coach. The numbers 37 and 6, retired for Casey Stengel and Joe Torre respectively, are the only numbers retired by the Yankees for someone who served solely as manager of the team. Stengel managed the Yankees to ten pennants and seven world championships between 1949 and 1960, including a record five consecutive world championships from 1949 through 1953. Joe Torre managed the Yankees from 1996 to 2007, winning six pennants and four World Series championships. On May 14, 2017, the Yankees retired number 2 in honor of Derek Jeter. This leaves 0 as the only single-digit number available for future Yankees, most recently worn by pitcher Adam Ottavino in 2020.

Hall of Famers

Rivalries
The Yankees have multiple rivalries across the league, most notably The Boston Red Sox. The Yankees have also had historical rivalries with former crosstown National League teams the Los Angeles Dodgers and San Francisco Giants, and current crosstown rivals the New York Mets. The much storied Dodgers-Yankees rivalry goes back to the Dodgers' tenure in Brooklyn. The two teams have met in the World Series 11 times including four matchups since the Dodgers relocated to Los Angeles in 1958. During the late 1990s, the Yankees built a rivalry with the Seattle Mariners as the two teams met in the postseason three times near the end of the decade. Most recently the team has developed a rivalry with the Houston Astros, fueled in part by the Houston Astros sign stealing scandal, believed by some Yankee fans to have contributed to their team's loss in the 2017 ALCS. The two teams have met in the postseason four times since 2015, and have pursued the same free agents and shared vitriol between both fanbases.

Boston Red Sox

The Yankees–Red Sox rivalry is one of the oldest, most famous, and fiercest rivalries in professional sports. The inaugural game between the two teams occurred more than 100 years ago, in 1903, when the Yankees (then known as the Highlanders) hosted the Red Sox (then named the Americans) at Hilltop Park. One of the major aspects of the rivalry is the Curse of the Bambino, where Babe Ruth was traded to the Yankees in 1920. Following the trade, the Red Sox did not win a World Series for 87 years, until 2004.

The rivalry is sometimes so polarizing that it is often a heated subject, especially in the Northeastern United States. Since the inception of the wild card team and an added Division Series, the rivals have met in the playoffs five times (with the Yankees winning the 1999 and 2003 American League Championship Series and the Red Sox winning in the 2004 American League Championship Series, 2018 American League Division Series and the 2021 American League Wild Card Game).  In addition, the teams have twice met in the last regular-season series of a season to decide the league title, in 1904 (when the Red Sox won) and 1949 (when the Yankees won).  Games between the two teams are often broadcast on national television and often yield high television ratings.

The teams also finished tied for first in 1978, when the Yankees won a high-profile tiebreaker game for the division title. The 1978 division race is memorable for the Red Sox having held a 14-game lead over the Yankees more than halfway through the season. Similarly, the 2004 ALCS is notable for the Yankees leading 3 games to 0 and ultimately losing the next four games and the series. The Red Sox comeback was the only time in MLB history that a team has come back from a 0–3 deficit to win a postseason series.

Subway Series

The Subway Series is a series of games played between teams based in New York City. The name originates from the New York City Subway and the accessibility of the each team's stadium within the subway system. Historically, the term "Subway Series" referred to games played between the Yankees and either the New York Giants or the Brooklyn Dodgers.  When the Dodgers and Giants moved to California in the late 1950s, the New York Mets were established as an expansion team in 1962. The term's historic usage has been in reference to World Series games played between New York teams.  The Yankees have appeared in all Subway Series games as they have been the only American League team in the city, and have compiled an 11–3 record in the 14 championship Subway Series. The most recent World Series between the two New York teams was in 2000, when the Yankees defeated the Mets. Since 1997, the term Subway Series has also been applied to interleague play during the regular season between the Yankees and National League New York Mets.

Minor league affiliations

As of the 2022 season, the New York Yankees farm system consists of six minor league affiliates.

See also 
 List of World Series champions
 List of New York Yankees managers

References

Notes

Sources

Bibliography
 
 
 
 
 
 
 New York Yankees: Manager and Coaches

External links

 
 "A Boy and His Job."  1969-06-04. Elliott Ashley, bat boy for the New York Yankees, explains his duties in this documentary produced by National Educational Television, preserved in the American Archive of Public Broadcasting.
 Baseball-Reference.com – year-by-year franchise index
 Baseball Almanac
 Sports E-Cyclopedia

 
1901 establishments in Maryland
Baseball teams established in 1901
Baseball teams in New York City
Former CBS Corporation subsidiaries
Grapefruit League
Major League Baseball teams
Sports in the Bronx
Yankee Global Enterprises